Roland Camille Roger Delorme (born December 18, 1983) is a Canadian mixed martial artist who formerly competed in the bantamweight division of the Ultimate Fighting Championship. He was a competitor on Spike TV's The Ultimate Fighter: Team Bisping vs. Team Miller.

MMA career

Early career
Delorme amassed a 7–2 record before going on The Ultimate Fighter, fighting exclusively in his native Canada.

The Ultimate Fighter
Delorme was picked last for Team Miller after beating B.J. Ferguson by triangle choke in the preliminary fights. He did not make the semi-finals, as he lost to T.J. Dillashaw by submission at the end of the second round after being outwrestled and constantly being taken down throughout the fight.

Ultimate Fighting Championship
Delorme fought Josh Ferguson at The Ultimate Fighter 14 Finale, winning via submission in the third round.

Delorme fought Nick Denis on May 5, 2012 at UFC on Fox: Diaz vs. Miller, replacing an injured Johnny Bedford. He beat Denis by rear-naked choke at 4:59 of an action-packed first round where both fighters were rocked until Delorme rallied and submitted Denis.

Delorme was briefly linked to a bout against promotional newcomer Bibiano Fernandes on July 21, 2012 at UFC 149.  However, Fernandes did not sign with the UFC. Delorme instead faced Francisco Rivera at the event. He lost via KO at 4:19 of the first round.  The result, however, was later changed to a No Contest when it was revealed Rivera had tested positive for a banned substance.

Delorme faced Edwin Figueroa on June 15, 2013 at UFC 161. He won the exciting back-and-forth fight by unanimous decision.

Delorme then faced Alex Caceres on September 21, 2013 at UFC 165. He lost the back-and-forth fight via split decision.

Delorme was expected to face Davey Grant on March 8, 2014 at UFC Fight Night 37. However the fight was cancelled after the weigh ins the day before the event due to Grant suffering a torn meniscus.

Delorme faced promotional newcomer Michinori Tanaka on June 14, 2014 at UFC 174. He lost the fight via unanimous decision.

Delorme next faced promotional newcomer Ulka Sasaki on August 23, 2014 at UFC Fight Night 48.  He lost the fight via submission in the first round, and was subsequently released from the promotion shortly after.

Mixed martial arts record

|-
|Loss
|align=center|10–6 (1)
|Jesse Arnett
|TKO (punches)
|SFL 42: Fight Night at the Corral
|
|align=center|2
|align=center|3:00
|Calgary, Alberta, Canada
|
|-
|Loss
|align=center|10–5 (1)
|Ulka Sasaki
|Submission (rear-naked choke)
|UFC Fight Night: Bisping vs. Le
|
|align=center|1
|align=center|1:06
|Macau, SAR, China
|
|-
|Loss
|align=center|10–4 (1)
|Michinori Tanaka
|Decision (unanimous)
|UFC 174
|
|align=center|3
|align=center|5:00
|Vancouver, British Columbia, Canada
|
|-
|Loss
|align=center|10–3 (1)
|Alex Caceres
|Decision (split)
|UFC 165
|
|align=center|3
|align=center|5:00
|Toronto, Ontario, Canada
|
|-
|Win
|align=center|10–2 (1)
|Edwin Figueroa
|Decision (unanimous)
|UFC 161
|
|align=center|3
|align=center|5:00
|Winnipeg, Manitoba, Canada
|
|-
|NC
|align=center|9–2 (1)
|Francisco Rivera
|NC (overturned loss) 
|UFC 149
|
|align=center|1
|align=center|4:19
|Calgary, Alberta, Canada
|
|-
|Win
|align=center|9–2
|Nick Denis
|Submission (rear-naked choke)
|UFC on Fox: Diaz vs. Miller
|
|align=center|1
|align=center|4:59
|East Rutherford, New Jersey, United States
|
|-
|Win
|align=center|8–2
|Josh Ferguson
|Submission (rear-naked choke)
|The Ultimate Fighter: Team Bisping vs. Team Miller Finale
|
|align=center|3
|align=center|0:22
|Las Vegas, Nevada, United States
|
|-
|Loss
|align=center|7–2
|Eric Wilson
|Decision (split)
|Canadian Fighting Championship 6
|
|align=center|3
|align=center|5:00
|Winnipeg, Manitoba, Canada
|
|-
|Win
|align=center|7–1
|Sean Quinn
|TKO (punches)
|Canadian Fighting Championship 5
|
|align=center|2
|align=center|3:02
|Winnipeg, Manitoba, Canada
|
|-
|Win
|align=center|6–1
|Remi Morvan
|Submission (rear-naked choke)
|Canadian Fighting Championship 4
|
|align=center|1
|align=center|2:28
|Winnipeg, Manitoba, Canada
|
|-
|Win
|align=center|5–1
|Remi Morvan
|Submission (armbar)
|Wreck MMA
|
|align=center|1
|align=center|4:21
|Gatineau, Quebec, Canada
|
|-
|Win
|align=center|4–1
|Stephane Denis
|TKO (punches)
|Canadian Fighting Championship 3
|
|align=center|2
|align=center|4:40
|Winnipeg, Manitoba, Canada
|
|-
|Win
|align=center|3–1
|Matt Veal
|Submission (rear-naked choke)
|UCW 16
|
|align=center|1
|align=center|3:30
|Winnipeg, Manitoba, Canada
|
|-
|Win
|align=center|2–1
|Dwight Sutherland
|Submission (armbar)
|UCW 13
|
|align=center|1
|align=center|4:40
|Winnipeg, Manitoba, Canada
|
|-
|Loss
|align=center|1–1
|Adam Lorenz
|TKO (punches)
|Ultimate Martial Arts Championship 7
|
|align=center|2
|align=center|0:03
|Regina, Saskatchewan, Canada
|
|-
|Win
|align=center|1–0
|Clayton Vallance
|Submission (rear-naked choke)
|Firestorm MMA 2
|
|align=center|1
|align=center|0:23
|Canada
|
|-

References

External links
 
 

1983 births
Living people
Bantamweight mixed martial artists
Mixed martial artists utilizing judo
Mixed martial artists utilizing Brazilian jiu-jitsu
Canadian male judoka
Canadian male mixed martial artists
Canadian practitioners of Brazilian jiu-jitsu
Sportspeople from Winnipeg
Ultimate Fighting Championship male fighters